William C. Weeks (born 1856) was an architect in Wisconsin.

He designed several works that are listed on the U.S. National Register of Historic Places.

Works include:
Jung Shoe Manufacturing Company Factory, 620 S. Eighth St., Sheboygan, Wisconsin (Weeks,William C.), NRHP-listed
Henry Store Foeste Building, 522 S. Eighth St., Sheboygan, Wisconsin (Weeks, William C.), NRHP-listed
Garton Toy Company, 746, 810, 830 N. Water St., 1104 Wisconsin Ave., Sheboygan, Wisconsin (Weeks, William C.), NRHP-listed
 Eliza Prange House, 605 Erie Avenue, Sheboygan, Wisconsin (Weeks, William C.), NRHP-listed

References

American architects
Architects from Wisconsin
1856 births
Year of death missing